The Peak Antifreeze and Motor Oil Indy 300 was an IndyCar Series race held at Chicagoland Speedway in Joliet, Illinois, United States.

In 2001, American open wheel racing debuted at the circuit with an IndyCar Series event. From 2006 to 2008, the race had served as the final round of the championship and where the series champion was decided.

Indy/Championship car racing first appeared in the Chicago area in 1914–1915 at Galesburg District Fairgrounds. Both races were 100 laps around the  dirt oval. AAA held races at Speedway Park, a  board track in nearby Maywood, Illinois. The first such race was a  event in 1915. Subsequent races ranged from 10–300 miles, and the final race was held in 1918. The track was eventually demolished, and the Edward Hines Veterans Hospital now stands on its former location.

Although no races would be held in the Chicago area until 1999, the state of Illinois hosted numerous USAC Championship Car races at Springfield and DuQuoin.

A CART race known as the Grand Prix of Chicago was held at Chicago Motor Speedway in Cicero, just outside Chicago, from 1999–2002. It was discontinued, however, when the track closed after the 2002 race.

Chicagoland Speedway gained a reputation as one of the most competitive oval circuits in the IRL with many races featuring extremely tight racing and close finishes, most notably 2002, 2003, 2008, and 2009. No car was able to break from the pack with most of the field usually running together and the leaders often directly nose to nose, similar to racing in NASCAR restrictor plate racing.

Notable races
2002: Sam Hornish Jr. edged Al Unser Jr. in a photo finish, officially by .0024 seconds in a battle in which the two racers fought for the lead for the final 22 laps side by side with literally no letup and at the head of a huge ten-car two-abreast draft that included Buddy Lazier, Hélio Castroneves, Buddy Rice, Eddie Cheever Jr., and Dan Wheldon.
2003: Sam Hornish Jr. edged Scott Dixon and Bryan Herta in a three-abreast photo finish in one of the closest finishes in Indycar racing history—.01 seconds.  Hornish, who led 40 laps, battled Tomas Scheckter (76 laps led), Dan Wheldon, and Tony Kanaan for the bulk of the race and also had to battle a late charge by Roger Yasukawa in the final six laps.  The lead officially changed hands 20 times among eight drivers and was usually contested in multilap wheel-to-wheel battles inches apart.
2007: Dario Franchitti led Scott Dixon by three points in the championship standings going into the race, which was the finale for the season. With two laps to go, Dixon led second-place Franchitti on a restart after a late caution. Both drivers were nursing their fuel mileage, hoping to stretch it to the finish. On the final lap, going into the third turn, Dixon ran out of fuel, and Franchitti slipped by to take the lead, win the race, and win the IndyCar Series championship.
2008: Hélio Castroneves begun the race 30 points away from the lead, and he began from the back and charged to the lead. Scott Dixon often ran around the positions 6–10, and Castroneves was often in a points lead position. Dixon began to challenge for the lead, and after two late cautions, Dixon and Castroneves ran 2-wide for the final two laps after battling side by side for the lead for most of the previous 40 laps, and Hélio won the race by 0.0033 seconds, or 12⅛ inches, in the second-closest finish in the twelve-year history of the series. Dixon won the championship by 17 points.

Past winners

AAA Championship Car history (Galesburg)

AAA Championship Car history (Speedway Park)

 Non-championship event

IndyCar Series history (Chicagoland)

Support Series

Indy Pro Series/Indy Lights

ARCA Menards Series
From 2001 to 2010 the ARCA Menards Series would run a race in support of the IndyCar series race.

NASCAR Gander RV & Outdoors Truck Series
In 2009 and 2010 the NASCAR Gander RV & Outdoors Truck Series ran a support race with the IndyCar weekend.

References

IndyCar.com race page
champcarstats.com

 
Former IndyCar Series races